Khiari (also Romanized as Khīārī and Khīyarī; also known as Aḩsham-e ‘Alī Aḩmad Kheyārī and Aḩsham-e ‘Alī Aḩmad Khīārī) is a village in Baghak Rural District, in the Central District of Tangestan County, Bushehr Province, Iran. At the 2006 census, its population was 434, in 107 families.

References 

Populated places in Tangestan County